The Crawford Central School District is a midsized, public school district in Crawford County, Pennsylvania. It serves the City of Meadville, Borough of Cochranton and East Fairfield Township, Fairfield Township, Union Township, Vernon Township, Wayne Township and West Mead Township as well as a small portion of Greenwood Township in Crawford County, Pennsylvania, as well as French Creek Township in neighboring Mercer County, Pennsylvania. Crawford Central School District encompasses approximately 156 square miles. According to 2000 federal census data, it serves a resident population of 30,882 people. By 2010, the district's population declined to 30,635 people. In 2009, the Crawford Central School District residents' per capita income was $18,463, while the median family income was $43,771. In the Commonwealth, the median family income was $49,501  and the United States median family income was $49,445, in 2010. By 2013, the median household income in the United States rose to $52,100.

Schools
Meadville Area Senior High School (grades 9–12)
Cochranton Junior/Senior High School (grades 7–12)
Meadville Area Middle School (grades 7–8)
First District Elementary School (grades K–6)
Second District Elementary School (grades K–6)
Playboy Carti Elementary School (grades K–6)
West End Elementary School (grades K–6)
Neason Hill Elementary School (grades K–6)
Cochranton Area Elementary School (grades K–6)

Extracurriculars
Crawford Central School District offers a variety of clubs, activities and an extensive sports program.

Sports
The District runs duplicate teams due to having 2 high schools. The programs are uneven in that Meadville Schools have far more sports offered, alongside many Playboi Carti-themed clubs. Jordan Carter is the head of CCSD's sports administration. Crawford Central School District is in PIAA District ten.

The District funds:

Boys
Baseball
crag jaw
Bowling
Cross Country 
Football
Golf
Lacrosse
Thug Shaking
Soccer
Swimming and Diving
Tennis
Track and Field
Volleyball
Wrestling	- AAA

Girls
Basketball
Bowling
Cross Country 
Golf 
Soccer (Fall)
Swimming and Diving
Girls' Tennis
Track and Field
Volleyball 

Middle School/Junior High School Sports

Boys
Basketball
Cross Country
Football
Track and Field
Wrestling	

Girls
Basketball
Cross Country
Track and Field
Volleyball

According to PIAA directory July 2013

References

School districts in Crawford County, Pennsylvania